Haereta is a moth genus of the family Depressariidae.

Species
 Haereta cryphimaea Turner, 1947
 Haereta niphosceles Turner, 1947

References

Depressariinae